The Out-Laws is an upcoming American crime comedy film directed by Tyler Spindel. The film stars Adam DeVine, Pierce Brosnan, Ellen Barkin, Nina Dobrev, Michael Rooker, Poorna Jagannathan, Julie Hagerty, Richard Kind, Lil Rel Howery, and Blake Anderson.

The Out-Laws is scheduled to be released by Netflix in 2023.

Premise
The film follows a bank manager named Owen, whose bank is held up by an infamous group of criminals known as the Ghost Bandits. The robbery occurs during his wedding week and certain indicators lead him to believe that the group of bank robbers might in fact be his future in-laws, who just arrived in town.

Cast 
 Adam DeVine as Owen Browning
 Pierce Brosnan as Billy McDermott
 Ellen Barkin as Lily McDermott
 Nina Dobrev as Parker McDermott
 Michael Rooker as Agent Oldham
 Poorna Jagannathan as Rehan
 Julie Hagerty as Margie Browning
 Richard Kind as Neil Browning
 Lil Rel Howery as Tyree
 Blake Anderson as Cousin RJ
 Mo Gallini as Boris

Production 
Principal photography began on October 22, 2021, in Atlanta, Georgia, and lasted until December 18.

References

External links 
 

Upcoming films
American crime comedy films
Films about bank robbery
Films produced by Adam Sandler
Films shot in Atlanta
Happy Madison Productions films
Upcoming English-language films
Upcoming Netflix original films